The Remedy is the third studio album by American hip hop group Native Deen, released on July 1, 2011 by Jamal Records.

Composition and release
The Remedy was released on July 1, 2011.

The album features percussion instruments and synthetic sounds, no wind or string instruments are used. In 2012, a voice only version of the album was released.

Track listing

References

External links

2011 albums
Arabic-language albums
Native Deen albums